23rd Century : Ngasigee Matungda (English: 23rd Century : After Today) is a 2014 Indian Meitei language film directed by Dinesh Tongbram and produced by Thambal Laishram, under the banner of United Films Manipur. The film features Gurumayum Bonny, Kaiku Rajkumar, Bala Hijam and Sonia Hijam in the lead roles. The film was premiered at Bhagyachandra Open Air Theatre (BOAT) on 17 October 2014. It is based on the 1992 theatrical play of Kamakhya Sangeet Mandal of the same title.

Cast
 Gurumayum Bonny
 Kaiku Rajkumar as Boyai
 Bala Hijam as Thambal
 Sonia Hijam
 Motibala
 Hidangmayum Guna
 Laimayum Gaitri
 Lourembam Pishak
 Iboyaima Khuman

Accolades
Dinesh Tongbram won the Best Screenplay Award at the 4th SSS MANIFA  2015 for the film.

See also 
 List of Meitei-language films

References

2010s Meitei-language films
2014 films